Pražská Strašidla (The Ghosts of Prague) is a collaborative album by Gary Lucas and Urfaust (aka Richard Mader) founder and head of Studio Faust Records. The album was released on the label in 1996.

Track listing

Personnel 
Jan Čambal – oboe and percussion on "Zakletí Mniši z Emauz" and "Petřínský Oheň"
Dominika – vocals on "Dvojníci z Nového Města" and "Vodníkova Nevěsta ze Zlaté Ulice"
Ivan Dvořák – drums on "O Tanečnici z Ozerova", "Zakletí Mniši z Emauz" and "Dvojníci z Nového Města"
Pat Fulgoni – vocals, trumpet on "Zakletí Mniši z Emauz"
Helena – vocals on "Dvojníci z Nového Města"
Mirka Křivánková – vocals on "Petřínský Oheň"
Gary Lucas – guitar, vocals on "Ohnivý Muž z Mokré Čtvrti", resonator guitar on "O Tanečnici z Ozerova"
Richard Mader – guitar, synthesizer, production
Pavel Ryba – bass guitar
P. Simon – saxophone on "Ohnivý Muž z Mokré Čtvrti" and "O Tanečnici z Ozerova"
Chris Sykes – drums on "Děvka a Mnich z Celetné Ulice"

References 

1996 albums
Gary Lucas albums